Jane Rebecca Rigby is an American astrophysicist who works at the Goddard Space Flight Center and is Operations Project Scientist at the James Webb Space Telescope. She was elected one of Nature's 10 Ones to Watch in 2021 and Shape 2022.

Early life and education 
Rigby became interested in astrophysics as a high school student. She has said Sally Ride made her realize that girls could study physics. Rigby was an undergraduate student at Pennsylvania State University. She worked toward a degree in physics and astronomy, and completed an undergraduate dissertation on MgII emission systems. She moved to the  University of Arizona for graduate studies, where she worked on X-ray diagnostics of active galactic nuclei under the supervision of George H. Rieke. Rigby spent six months as a postdoctoral fellow at the University of Arizona before being appointed a Carnegie Fellow at the Carnegie Observatories.

Research and career 
In 2010, Rigby was appointed Deputy Operations Project Scientist at the James Webb Space Telescope and civil servant at Goddard Space Flight Center. She was made Project Scientist for Operations in 2018. She delivered a TED talk on space telescopes in 2011. 

Rigby is responsible for TEMPLATES (Targeting Extremely Magnified Panchromatic Lensed Arcs and Their Extended Star Formation), a project that looks to use high signal-to-noise NIRSpec and mid-infrared integral field units (IFU) spectroscopy to image 4 gravitationally lensed galaxies. The program is expected to spatially resolve star formation.

Academic service 
Rigby was a founding member of the American Astronomical Society LGBT Equality Working Group. In 2015 she co-organised Inclusive Astronomy, a worldwide initiative to celebrate inclusivity and equity in astronomy.

Awards and honors 
 2006 Spitzer Space Telescope Postdoctoral Fellow
 2013 Eberly College of Science Outstanding Alumni Award
 2013 NASA Robert H. Goddard Award for Exceptional Achievement for Science
 2014 NASA Robert H. Goddard Award for Diversity and Equal Employment Opportunity
 2015 Goddard Space Flight Center Peer Award
 2018 John C. Lindsay Memorial Award for Space Science
 2021 Nature's 10 Ones to Watch in 2022
 2022 Out to Innovate LGBTQ+ Scientist of the Year
 2022 BBC 100 Women
 2022 Nature's 10

Selected publications

Personal life 
Rigby came out as lesbian in 2000. When she joined Arizona as a graduate student, it was still illegal to be gay there.

References 

American astrophysicists

Women astrophysicists

Living people

Year of birth missing (living people)
Goddard Space Flight Center people
Pennsylvania State University alumni
University of Arizona alumni
Lesbian scientists
American LGBT scientists
BBC 100 Women